Cleptonotus is a genus of longhorn beetles of the subfamily Lamiinae, containing the following species:

 Cleptonotus albomaculatus (Blanchard in Gay, 1851)
 Cleptonotus subarmatus (Fairmaire & Germain, 1859)

References

Parmenini